Evan Balfour (born 9 September 1965) is a Scottish footballer, who played in the Scottish Football League for Airdrieonians and Ayr United. Balfour played for Airdrieonians in the 1992 Scottish Cup Final, which they lost 2–1 to Rangers.

External links

1968 births
Living people
Scottish footballers
Association football midfielders
Airdrieonians F.C. (1878) players
Ayr United F.C. players
Scottish Football League players
Footballers from Edinburgh
Whitburn Junior F.C. players
Scotland junior international footballers
Scottish Junior Football Association players